Richard Münch may refer to:

Richard Münch (actor) (1916–1987), German actor
Richard Münch (sociologist) (born 1945), German sociologist